"" is the national anthem of Somalia. Written and composed by Abdullahi Qarshe, it was adopted on 1 August 2012 with the passage of the Somali national constitution, in which it is enshrined. It replaced "Soomaaliyeey toosoo", which had been in use since 2000. "Soomaaliyeey toosoo" is often still used as a de facto national anthem, though the official national anthem for Somalia is "Qoloba Calankeed".

Lyrics

See also

History of Somalia
Flag of Somalia
 National anthem of Somalia (1960–2000), the Somali national anthem from 1960 to 2000
 "Soomaaliyeey toosoo", the Somali national anthem from 2000 to 2012

Notes

References

External links
Worldstatesmen - Somalia
http://www.nationalanthems.info/so.htm

National anthems
Somalian music
National symbols of Somalia
2012 in Somalia
African anthems
National anthem compositions in F major